Sagittaria secundifolia (Kral's water plantain, Little River arrowhead) is an aquatic plant, growing on or below the water, on rocky creek beds and nearby slopes. It is found only along the Little River of Alabama, and is endangered.  It is often found in association with azaleas (Rhododendron spp), mountain laurel (Kalmia) and holly (Ilex). Perennial, aquatic herb with an underwater, thick horizontal root about 5–10 centimeters (2–4 in) long and 6 millimeters (0.25 in) thick. This particular species grows in the cracks in stream beds. Each leaf arches upward and is 5–10 centimeters (2–4 in) long with a pointed tip. Sagittaria secundifolia is found in the Little River drainage in DeKalb and Cherokee counties, the Town Creek drainage in DeKalb County, and in the West Sipsey Fork in Winston County in Alabama. .
  
Both threatened and endangered species and poached species are critical resources to several parks.   The last known population of Sagittaria secundifolia is in the Little River system (USFWS 1991), and the endangered green pitcher plant (Sarracenia oreophila) and harperella (Harperella nodosa) are also found there (LIRI). The Lookout Mountain (CHCH) population of the federally endangered mountain skullcap (Scutellaria montana) is listed as one of the last ten remaining population. The Tennessee coneflower (Echinacea tennesseensis) population at STRI is one of five remaining (USFWS 1989).

Some of reasons why Sagittaria secundifolia is endangered is because of things like Erosion-related water quality degradation, silting and turbidity, resulting from development residential -recreational, surface mining, agriculture, and forest conversion. Another thing that causes the plantain to be endangered is water pollution from garbage dumping and leaking sewage systems. Water impoundments and off road vehicle traffic also causes great harm towards the species.

References

External links
Ecos.fws.gov
Fs.fed.us

secundifolia
Flora of Alabama
Freshwater plants
Edible plants
Plants described in 1982